Allactite is a rare arsenate mineral of metamorphosed manganese zinc ore deposits. It is found in Sweden and New Jersey, US. Its name originated from Greek αλλάκτειν (allaktein) meaning "to change", referring to the strong pleochroism of the mineral.

References

Bibliography
Palache, P.; Berman H.; Frondel, C. (1960). "Dana's System of Mineralogy, Volume II: Halides, Nitrates, Borates, Carbonates, Sulfates, Phosphates, Arsenates, Tungstates, Molybdates, Etc. (Seventh Edition)" John Wiley and Sons, Inc., New York, pp. 785-787.

Arsenate minerals
Manganese(II) minerals
Monoclinic minerals
Minerals in space group 14